Spilosoma flavidior is a moth in the family Erebidae. It was described by Max Gaede in 1923. It is found in the Afrotropics.

References

Moths described in 1923
flavidior